Willers is a surname. Notable people with the surname include:

Celine Willers (born 1993), German beauty pageant titleholder
Diedrich Willers Jr. (1833–1908), American politician
Marc Willers (born 1985), New Zealand racing cyclist 
Terry Willers (1935–2011), Irish cartoonist and animator
Tobias Willers (born 1987), German footballer 
Uno Willers (1911–1980), Swedish historian and librarian